A general election were held in the U.S. state of Idaho on November 3, 2020. To vote by mail, registered Idaho voters must request a ballot by October 23, 2020.

State offices

Legislative

Idaho Senate

All 35 seats of the Idaho Senate were up for election. The Republican Party won 28 seats while the Democratic Party won 7 seats. No districts changed hands.

Idaho House of Representatives

All 70 seats in the Idaho House of Representatives were up for election. The Republicans won 58 seats while the Democrats won 12 seats. The Republicans gained 2 seats, 15B and 29A.

Federal offices

President of the United States

Idaho had 4 electoral votes in the Electoral College. Republican Donald Trump won all of them with 64% of the popular vote.

United States Senate

One of the two United States Senators representing Idaho was up for election. Incumbent Republican Jim Risch won with 63% of the votes.

United States House of Representatives

Idaho had 2 representatives in the United States House of Representatives who were up for election. Republicans won all of the districts. No seats changed hands.

Ballot measure

Constitutional Amendment HJR4

See also
 Elections in Idaho
 Politics of Idaho
 Political party strength in Idaho

References

External links
  (State affiliate of the U.S. League of Women Voters)
 
 
 
 

 
Idaho